Matteo Paro (born 17 March 1983) is an Italian former footballer who played as a midfielder.

Career

Juventus
Paro made his Serie A debut on 17 May 2003, in a 2–1 loss to Reggina.

Chievo
In the summer of 2003, Juventus sold half of Paro's contract to Chievo in July for €450,000 total fee along with Sculli and Gastaldello as part of the deal that sent defender Nicola Legrottaglie the other way. Paro himself was valued for €50,000 only (50% rights).

Siena
In 2005, Juventus bought back all three for €1.05 million (€350,000 each). But Paro and Gastaldello were sold to Siena in another joint-ownership deal for €450,000 each.

Return to Juventus
In 2006, Juventus relegated to Serie B, and bought back Paro's 50% rights from Siena, for undisclosed fee. He also holds the distinction of scoring Juventus' first ever Serie B goal, during Juventus's 1–1 away draw with Rimini on 9 September 2006.

Genoa
In summer 2007, he was sold to Genoa in joint-ownership deal, for €1.5 million. reunited with Sculli. Also Gastaldello joined Genoa's city rival U.C. Sampdoria.

Juventus received another €2 million for the player in June 2008.

In July 2009. Paro joined newly promoted side Bari on loan. The club also signed Riccardo Meggiorini, Leonardo Bonucci, Andrea Ranocchia (loan) and Giuseppe Greco (loan) from Genoa. On 29 January 2010, AS Bari loaned the midfielder to Piacenza.

Vicenza 
In summer 2010 he left for Vicenza on loan. In summer 2011 Danilo Russo returned to Genoa and Paro joined Vicenza in another temporary deal.

References

External links
Player Profile at VicenzaCalcio.com  
 

Living people
1983 births
People from Asti
Footballers from Piedmont
Association football midfielders
Italian footballers
Juventus F.C. players
A.C. ChievoVerona players
A.C.N. Siena 1904 players
Genoa C.F.C. players
S.S.C. Bari players
F.C. Crotone players
Piacenza Calcio 1919 players
L.R. Vicenza players
Mantova 1911 players
Serie A players
Serie B players
Serie C players
Sportspeople from the Province of Asti